TZ Arietis (also known as Gliese 83.1, GJ 9066, or L 1159-16) is a red dwarf in the northern constellation of Aries. It is a flare star, which means it can suddenly increase in brightness for short periods of time.

Variability
TZ Arietis is a variable star. It is a flare star, showing brief increases in brightness due to eruptions from its surface. In the ultraviolet, flares of over a magnitude have been observed. In addition it shows longterm variations in brightness which may be due to starspots and rotation, possibly classifying it as a BY Draconis variable. It was given the variable star designation TZ Arietis in 1970.

Planetary system

In a preprint submitted to arXiv in June 2019, three candidate planets were reported in orbit around this star (GJ 83.1) with orbital periods of 2, 240, and 770 days. A paper published in August 2020 reported a confirmation of the 240-day and 770-day planets, designating them "b" and "c", respectively.

In March 2022, astronomers using the Calar Alto Observatory in Spain, as part of the CARMENES survey project, reported an independent confirmation of the 770-day planet, which they designated "b". However, they found no evidence for the 240-day planet, and confidently defined the 2-day candidate as nothing more than a spurious chromatic effect of the star, linked to its rotation. The NASA Exoplanet Archive still refers to the confirmed, 770-day planet as "c".

See also
List of nearest stars and brown dwarfs

References

Notes

Further reading

 Table 1.
 Table with parallaxes.

External links
 ARICNS entry 
 luyten-1159-16 
 Image luyten-1159-16
 GJ 83.1
 Image TZ Arietis

Local Bubble
M-type main-sequence stars
Aries (constellation)
Flare stars
0083.1
Arietis, TZ
J02001278+1303112
Planetary systems with one confirmed planet